The Russia–United States maritime boundary was established by the June 1, 1990  USA/USSR Maritime Boundary Agreement  (since Russia declared itself to be the successor of the Soviet Union). The United States Senate gave its advice and consent to ratification as early as on September 16, 1991, but it has yet to be approved by the Russian State Duma. This delimitation line is also known as the Baker-Shevardnadze line or Baker-Shevardnadze agreement, after the officials who signed the deal, Minister of Foreign Affairs of the Soviet Union Eduard Shevardnadze and U.S. Secretary of State James Baker.  In general concept, the 1990 line is based on the 1867 United States – Russia Convention providing for the U.S. purchase of Alaska. 
From the point, 65° 30' N, 168° 58' 37" W the maritime boundary extends north along the 168° 58' 37" W meridian through the Bering Strait and Chukchi Sea into the Arctic Ocean as far as permitted under international law. From the same point southwards, the boundary follows a line specified by maritime geographic positions given in the Agreement.

Dispute

The need for the maritime boundary arose with the introduction of the 200-mile limit by the United States and the Soviet Union. The United States proposed using the 1867 Alaska line because it understood that to be the likely Soviet position.   The 1990 delimitation was complicated since neither side could produce the maps used during the original Alaska purchase negotiations. Furthermore, the two sides agreed that the boundary was intended to be a straight line on a map, but they did not agree which map projection was used: Mercator or conformal. This resulted in about 15,000 square nautical miles of disputed area. The 1990 line split the difference between the two lines and introduced several "special areas", which were beyond the 200-mile zone, but in which the sides ceded their rights to the opponent.  Many in Russia have criticized Mikhail Gorbachev and Edvard Shevardnadze for rushing the deal, ceding the Russian fishing rights and other maritime benefits, but so far both states have respected the line agreed in 1990. The United States continues efforts to enforce the boundary line against the encroaching Russian fishing vessels, in order to build up the evidence of "general state practice" that the 1990 agreement is indeed the marine border between the two countries.

References

Further reading
 International Boundary Study No. 14 (Revised) – October 1, 1965 U.S. – Russia Convention Line of 1867

Geography of the Russian Far East
Boundary treaties
Russia–United States border
Soviet Union–United States treaties
1990 in the Soviet Union
Treaties concluded in 1990
Treaties not entered into force
Unratified treaties
International borders
Borders of Russia
Borders of the United States
Russia–United States relations
Borders of the Soviet Union
Maritime boundaries
Soviet Union–United States relations